Ronan Hale (born 8 September 1998) is an Irish professional footballer who plays for Cliftonville in the NIFL Premiership, having previously played for Larne, St Patrick's Athletic, Crusaders, Derry City and Birmingham City. His brother Rory Hale is also a professional footballer, currently with Cliftonville and the pair's grandfather is Derry City and Crusaders legend Danny Hale.

Club career

Early career
Growing up in Newington, Belfast, Hale started off playing his youth football with local club Crusaders. It was there that he caught the eye and earned a move to England with Birmingham City. During this time, his brother Rory was playing at his side's city rivals, Aston Villa, which made the homesickness he suffered a little easier with both living in Birmingham.
He scored an incredible 28 goals in 23 games for Birmingham City U21 side in his first season at the club, before moving up to the Birmingham City U23 side, where he scored 4 goals in 16 appearances.

Derry City loan
Hale signed a six-month loan deal with League of Ireland Premier Division side Derry City alongside his brother Rory Hale on 3 January 2018. He made his debut in senior football on 12 February 2018 away to Waterford at the RSC. His first senior goals came on 12 March 2018 when he scored a hat-trick in a 5–0 win over Limerick at the Brandywell. He followed this up 4 days later by scoring again in a 5–1 win over Bray Wanderers. His loan deal with Derry was extended until the end of the season on 28 June 2018. This allowed him his first taste of European football as he featured in both legs of the club's UEFA Europa League tie against Dinamo Minsk of Belarus. Derry lost the first leg 2–0 at home, leaving them with an uphill battle to go through in the second leg. After an early goal from Ally Roy, Derry performed well and after conceding a first half equaliser, Hale scored the winner in the 75th minute but it wasn't enough despite a late Derry push as they were knocked out 3–2 on aggregate. The 16 September 2018 saw Hale win the first trophy of his senior career when he scored in a 3–1 win over Cobh Ramblers as Derry City won the League of Ireland Cup for the record 11th time. Hale ended the season, with 12 goals in 40 appearances in his first season in senior football. He returned to Birmingham City at the end of his loan spell.

Crusaders
On 11 January 2019, Birmingham City announced that Hale's contract had been terminated by mutual consent. It was announced shortly after that Hale had moved back to Belfast, signing a two-and-a-half-year contract with Crusaders. After his brother Rory, Ronan became the fourth member of his family to represent the club, following in his grandfather Danny and great-uncle Gerry's footsteps. He made his debut in a 1–0 defeat to Linfield on 19 January 2019. His first goal for the club came a week later when he scored in a 3–1 win away to Institute. He was part of the squad that won the County Antrim Shield following a 4–3 thriller against Linfield in the final in March. He was an unused substitute in the Irish Cup Final as Crusaders beat Ballinamallard United 3–0 in the final at Windsor Park. He finished the season with 3 goals in 18 appearances.

St Patrick's Athletic

2019 season
It was announced on 1 August 2019 that Hale had signed an 18-month contract with Dublin club St Patrick's Athletic, given the number 25 shirt, keeping him at the club until the end of the 2020 season. Hale made his debut the following day away to Cork City, coming off the bench for Ciaran Kelly in the 74th minute before scoring a 91st-minute winner to secure all 3 points for his new side with a 1–0 win. He went on to finish the season with 9 appearances in all competitions and one goal.

2020 season
Hale started the 2020 season off well, scoring an excellent goal in a 5–1 win pre-season friendly over Cobh Ramblers on 16 January 2020, dribbling past two defenders before finishing into the bottom right corner. Two days later he scored a penalty in a 6–0 win against Fermoy in a friendly. He finished a pre-season in top form, scoring 2 goals against Athlone Town and the winner against Galway United to make it 5 goals in 5 games. He scored on his first start of the season, opening the scoring in a 2–0 win over Sligo Rovers at The Showgrounds. It was announced on 1 August 2020, exactly one year since he joined the club, that Hale had departed to sign for Larne of the NIFL Premiership.

Larne
Hale returned to the NIFL Premiership on 1 August 2020, signing for Larne. He scored a penalty in his first league game for Larne, as they beat Dungannon Swifts 3–0 on the opening day of the season.

In Larne's maiden European campaign Hale scored the winner in a first round 2021–22 UEFA Europa Conference League tie  and in the next round his goal eliminated Aarhus Gymnastikforening

At the end of the 2021–22 NIFL Premiership season, he scored all four goals for Larne in the UEFA Europa Conference League play-off final match after coming on as a substitute as the club came back from 2–0 down against Glentoran.  His goals in the 75th, 84th, 100th and 121st minutes included the fourth, dubbed a "wonder-goal" a 75 yard strike from just outside his own penalty box.

Cliftonville
On 26 May 2022, Hale signed for Cliftonville.

Hale scored on his debut in a 2022–23 UEFA Europa Conference League tie at FC DAC 1904 Dunajská Streda

International career
Hale played for Republic of Ireland national under-19 football team in the 2017 UEFA European Under-19 Championship qualification and then scored on his Republic of Ireland national under-21 football team debut

Career statistics
Professional appearances – correct as of 14 May 2022.

Honours
Derry City
League of Ireland Cup: 2018

Crusaders
Irish Cup: 2018–19
County Antrim Shield: 2018–19

Larne
County Antrim Shield (2): 2020–21, 2021–22

References

External links
 
 
 

 
 

1998 births
Living people
Association footballers from Belfast
Birmingham City F.C. players
Derry City F.C. players
Crusaders F.C. players
St Patrick's Athletic F.C. players
Larne F.C. players
League of Ireland players
NIFL Premiership players
Association football forwards
Republic of Ireland association footballers
Republic of Ireland under-21 international footballers
Republic of Ireland expatriate association footballers
Republic of Ireland youth international footballers
Cliftonville F.C. players